Myosotis nemorosa (syn. Myosotis strigulosa) is a plant species of the genus Myosotis. They are native to most of mainland Europe.

References

nemorosa
Taxa named by Wilibald Swibert Joseph Gottlieb von Besser